Oreolyce is an Indomalayan genus of butterflies in the family Lycaenidae.

Species
Subgenus Oreolyce
 Oreolyce quadriplaga (Snellen, 1892) – Naga hedge blue
 Oreolyce archena (Corbet, 1940)
 Oreolyce boulti (Chapman, 1912) Borneo
 Oreolyce dohertyi (Tytler, 1915) Naga Hills
Subgenus Arletta Hemming, 1935
 Oreolyce vardhana (Moore, [1875]) – dusky hedge blue

References

 
Lycaenidae genera
Taxa named by Lambertus Johannes Toxopeus